POTOC or Potoc may refer to:

 Potteries Orienteering Club
 Potoc, a river in Romania
A village in Sasca Montană, Romania

See also
 Potoče (disambiguation)
 Potoci (disambiguation)
 Potok (disambiguation)